, sometimes referred to as Yoshi Kawaguchi, is a former Japanese professional footballer who played as a goalkeeper. He is a former captain of the Japan national team.

Career

Early career 
Born in Fuji, Shizuoka Prefecture, Kawaguchi studied at Shimizu Commercial High School and was a member of the football team there. After finishing high school, he joined the professional football team Yokohama Marinos (later Yokohama F. Marinos).

Portsmouth 
Following impressive performances for both club and country, he moved to English club Portsmouth, signing for a club record £1.8m. However, he struggled to adapt to life in the English Football League, and struggled with the physical side of the First Division, notably in a 3–1 away defeat to Grimsby Town. Kawaguchi lost his place to veteran Dave Beasant after being held responsible for Portsmouth's 4–1 home defeat to underdogs Leyton Orient in the FA Cup. Despite his poor performances for Pompey he remained something of a cult hero with the fans, on account of his cheerful demeanour, and his insistence that he would work hard to regain his place. After a season of playing reserve team football, he made his final appearance for Portsmouth in the final game of the 2002–03 Football League First Division championship winning season, coming on at half time to a standing ovation in the 5–0 win against Bradford City.

Nordsjælland 
Despite this brief reappearance, he realised that his future lay elsewhere, and moved on to Nordsjælland of the Danish league.

Júbilo Iwata 
Prior to the 2005 Japanese football season, Kawaguchi returned to his home country when he signed with then-perennial title-contenders Júbilo Iwata.

International career

Early career (1996–2001) 
Kawaguchi was called up to the Japanese national team and played in the Atlanta Olympic games. He kept a clean sheet against Brazil in the first game. He played in Japan's first ever World Cup game in 1998 in a 1–0 defeat to Argentina, and throughout the tournament, his stellar performance prevented Japan from being scored more than one, with all three Japanese defeats were just one-goal margin. In 2001, Kawaguchi was Japan's first-choice goalkeeper as the team finished runner-up in the Confederations Cup.

Captain (2004–2006) 
Kawaguchi is a noted penalty stopper, making two saves in the shootout against Jordan in the 2004 Asian Cup quarter-final and also saving from Croatia's Darijo Srna in the 2006 World Cup. During the 2007 Asian Cup he was instrumental in Japan's quarter-final win against Australia making two saves from Harry Kewell and Lucas Neill in the penalty shootout, thus making him the Man of the Match.

In August 2006, it was revealed that he would wear the captain's armband, as new Japan manager Ivica Osim believed that former captain Tsuneyasu Miyamoto was not getting enough playing time at his domestic club, Gamba Osaka.

Marginal role (2008–2010) 
Kawaguchi is his country's most-capped goalkeeper and overall third most-capped player with 116 caps for Japan, six behind second-placed Masami Ihara with 122 caps, but an injury in 2008 had since sidelined him from action. Long-time rival Seigo Narazaki had since been playing as first-choice keeper for Japan.

A broken leg sustained in a J1 League clash against Kyoto Sanga FC appeared to have sidelined him for the rest of the season thus ruling him out of the 2010 World Cup. However, after making a full and quick recovery Japanese head coach Takeshi Okada decided to include him in the final squad announced on 10 May 2010. Kawaguchi was one of two Japanese players (the other being Seigo Narazaki) to be named for their national team's 4th consecutive World Cup. Despite his period of inactivity and having fallen to third in the pecking order, Okada selected him in the hope that his leadership and experience would aid the team's progress. Kawaguchi was appointed captain of the national team during team training on 21 May 2010.

Kawaguchi was not picked to play for the national team under coach Alberto Zaccheroni, and with youngster Eiji Kawashima impressing in Japan's 2011 Asian Cup success, the Fuji-shi born custodian's international career was effectively over.

Career statistics

Club

International

Honours 
Yokohama F. Marinos
 J1 League: 1995, 2000

Portsmouth
 Football League First Division: 2002–03

Japan
AFC Asian Cup: 2000, 2004
AFC-OFC Challenge Cup: 2001
Afro-Asian Cup of Nations: 2007

Individual
 J.League Rookie of the Year: 1995
 The Best 11: 2001
 AFC Best Player of the Month: June 2001
 Asian Cup All-Star Team: 2004
 J.League Best XI: 2006
 J.League Fair Play Award: 2008
 J.League 20th Anniversary Team

See also
 List of men's footballers with 100 or more international caps

References

External links

 
 
 Japan National Football Team Database
 
 Yoshikatsu Kawaguchi at SC Sagamihara

1975 births
Living people
Association football people from Shizuoka Prefecture
Japanese footballers
Japan international footballers
J1 League players
J2 League players
J3 League players
English Football League players
Danish Superliga players
Yokohama F. Marinos players
Portsmouth F.C. players
FC Nordsjælland players
Júbilo Iwata players
FC Gifu players
SC Sagamihara players
Olympic footballers of Japan
Footballers at the 1996 Summer Olympics
1998 FIFA World Cup players
1999 Copa América players
2000 AFC Asian Cup players
2001 FIFA Confederations Cup players
2002 FIFA World Cup players
2003 FIFA Confederations Cup players
2004 AFC Asian Cup players
2005 FIFA Confederations Cup players
2006 FIFA World Cup players
2007 AFC Asian Cup players
2010 FIFA World Cup players
AFC Asian Cup-winning players
Japanese expatriate footballers
Expatriate footballers in England
Expatriate men's footballers in Denmark
Japanese expatriate sportspeople in England
Japanese expatriate sportspeople in Denmark
Association football goalkeepers
FIFA Century Club